Daniel Kimaiyo (born 11 January 1948) is a Kenyan former track and field athlete who specialised in the 400 metres hurdles.

He became the first African to win the 400 m hurdles title at the Commonwealth Games in 1978, doing so in a time of 49.48 seconds after setting a lifetime best of 49.20 seconds in qualifying. He also led off the Kenyan 4×400 metres relay quartet to win a second gold in a Games record of 3:03.54 minutes. That year he also secured a continental title at the 1978 All-Africa Games, succeeding John Akii-Bua, and won a relay bronze with Kenya.

Kimaiyo won a second continental title at the 1979 African Championships in Athletics, where he was the inaugural 400 m hurdles champion. With the 4 × 400 m relay team he also helped his nation to the first ever title. In addition to these titles, he was the winner of the hurdles at the East and Central African Championships.

See also
List of champions of the African Athletics Championships

References

Living people
1948 births
Kenyan male hurdlers
Commonwealth Games gold medallists for Kenya
Commonwealth Games medallists in athletics
Athletes (track and field) at the 1978 Commonwealth Games
African Games gold medalists for Kenya
African Games medalists in athletics (track and field)
Athletes (track and field) at the 1978 All-Africa Games
Medallists at the 1978 Commonwealth Games